Greg Rallo (born August 26, 1981) is an American former professional ice hockey player who predominantly played in the American Hockey League (AHL). He appeared in 11 games in the National Hockey League (NHL) with the Florida Panthers.

Playing career
Undrafted, Rallo played two seasons with the Texas Stars before he was signed to a one-year contract by the Florida Panthers on July 2, 2011. In the 2011–12 season, he made his long-awaited debut in the NHL as a 30-year-old in a 3-2 overtime victory against the Carolina Hurricanes on December 18, 2011. He was re-signed to a one-year, two way contract extension on July 1, 2012.

After three seasons within the Panthers organization, Rallo returned to the Texas Stars on a one-year AHL contract on August 1, 2014. After two years playing for the Stars, he decided to venture to Europe, signing on a one-year contract for the German club, Iserlohn Roosters of the Deutsche Eishockey Liga on August 12, 2016. In the 2016–17 season with the Roosters, Rallo played on the top two scoring lines, finishing 5th in scoring with 25 points in 45 games as Iserlohn finished out of playoff contention. On March 3, 2017, it was announced that Rallo's contract would not be renewed.

On July 5, 2017, Rallo signed a one-year AHL contract in for his third stint with the Texas Stars. Limited to 29 games through injury in the 2017–18 season, Rallo completed his final professional year with 5 goals and 11 points.

Having played 12 professional seasons, Rallo announced his retirement in accepting an assistant coaching role with the Milwaukee Admirals of the AHL on July 12, 2018.

Career statistics

References

External links

1981 births
Albany River Rats players
American men's ice hockey centers
Ferris State Bulldogs men's ice hockey players
Florida Panthers players
Ice hockey players from Illinois
Idaho Steelheads (ECHL) players
Iowa Stars players
Iserlohn Roosters players
Living people
Manitoba Moose players
People from Gurnee, Illinois
Rockford IceHogs (AHL) players
San Antonio Rampage players
Texas Stars players
Undrafted National Hockey League players